Geitocochylis is a genus of moths belonging to the family Tortricidae.

Species
Geitocochylis gustatoria Razowski, 1984
Geitocochylis gyrantrum Razowski, 1984
Geitocochylis paromala Razowski, 1984
Geitocochylis tarphionima Razowski, 1984

See also
List of Tortricidae genera

References

 , 1984, Bull. Acad. Pol. Sci., Sr. Sci. Biol. 32: 273
 , 2005, World Catalogue of Insects 5
 , 2011: Diagnoses and remarks on genera of Tortricidae, 2: Cochylini (Lepidoptera: Tortricidae). Shilap Revista de Lepidopterologia 39 (156): 397–414.

External links
tortricidae.com

Cochylini
Tortricidae genera